Namissiguima is a department or commune of Yatenga Province in northern Burkina Faso. Its capital lies at the town of Namissiguima.

Towns and villages
Loungue

References

Departments of Burkina Faso
Yatenga Province